Romania competed at the 2012 Winter Youth Olympics in Innsbruck, Austria.

Alpine skiing

Romania qualified 1 athlete.

Boys

Biathlon

Romania qualified 3 athletes.

Boys

Girls

Mixed

Bobsleigh

Romania qualified 2 athletes.

Girls

Cross-country skiing

Romania qualified 2 athletes.

Boys

Girls

Sprint

Mixed

Ice hockey

Romania qualified 2 athletes.

Boys

Girls

Luge

Romania qualified 5 athletes.

Boys

Girls

Team

Skeleton

Romania qualified 3 athletes.

Boys

Girls

Ski jumping

Romania qualified 1 athlete.

Boys

Speed skating

Romania qualified 3 athletes.

Boys

Girls

See also
Romania at the 2012 Summer Olympics

References

2012 in Romanian sport
Nations at the 2012 Winter Youth Olympics
Romania at the Youth Olympics